Bökény is an outskirt belonging to the settlement Magyarcsanád in Hungary. Bökény is located  directly near the Maros (in Hungarian; in Romanian: Mureș), at the Romanian-Hungarian border. Here is a tumulus in which archeological artefacts were found.

Populated places in Csongrád-Csanád County